Hossein Shenani is an Iranian football forward who currently plays for Iranian football club Zob Ahan in the Persian Gulf Pro League.

Club career
Shenani started his career with Foolad from youth levels. He moved to Foolad Novin in 2014. In Summer 2015, He joined to Malavan. He made his professional debut against Foolad on October 31, 2015 as a substitute for Mohammad Razipour.

Club career statistics

Honours

Club
Foolad Novin
 Azadegan League (1): 2014–15

References

External links
 Hossein Shenani at IranLeague.ir

1993 births
Living people
Iranian footballers
People from Abadan, Iran
Association football forwards
Malavan players
Mes Rafsanjan players
Sepidrood Rasht players
Sanat Mes Kerman F.C. players
Zob Ahan Esfahan F.C. players
Persian Gulf Pro League players